The Kid Stakes is a 1927 Australian silent black and white comedy film written and directed by Tal Ordell.

The screenplay is based on characters created by Syd Nicholls in his comic strip, Fatty Finn.

Plot summary
Fatty Finn (Robin 'Pop' Ordell) is the six-year-old leader of a gang of kids in Woolloomooloo. They enter Fatty's pet goat Hector in the annual goat derby, but his rival Bruiser Murphy (Frank Boyd) lets the goat loose before the race. After a series of adventures, Fatty finds the runaway goat and persuades a friendly aviator to fly him to the race-track in time for the main event.

Cast
Robin 'Pop' Ordell as Fatty Finn
Charles Roberts as Tiny King
Eileen Alexander as Madeline Twirt
Ray Salmon as Jimmy Kelly
Leonard Durell as Constable Claffey
Frank Boyd as Bruiser Murphy
Billy Ireland as Seasy
Eileen Alexander as Madeline Twirt
Jimmy Taylor as Horatio John Wart 
Tad Ordell as Radio race-caller
Syd Nicholls as self
David Nettheim as Baby in Pram

Production
The majority of the shooting locations for The Kid Stakes were in Woolloomooloo and Potts Point in Sydney.

The film's finale, the goat race, however was filmed in Rockhampton, Queensland, because goat racing was illegal in New South Wales.

The role of Fatty Finn was played by Tal Ordell's six-year-old son Robin, known as 'Pop' Ordell.

Reception
The film premiered at the Wintergarden Theatre in Brisbane on 9 June 1927. The now defunct weekly magazine, Pix, in its review states "Kid Stakes brings back the Sydney of the 1920s. They were all on parade; the ragged urchins, the brawling and the free-fisted characters of the waterfront."

Ordell sold the remake rights to England and had discussions to make a talking version in 1930. However this did not eventuate and Ordell never directed another feature.

Robin Ordell went on to become a star of Sydney radio in the 1930s. He then joined the Royal Australian Air Force and won a Distinguished Flying Cross (DFC). He was killed over the Netherlands in 1945 at about the age of 24.

The movie was thought lost until rediscovered in 1952. It was re-released two years later.

The Kid Stakes was remade as Fatty Finn in 1980.

See also
 Cinema of Australia
 Ginger Meggs

References

External links

The Kid Stakes at Australian Screen Online
The Kid Stakes at Oz Movies

1927 films
Australian silent feature films
Australian black-and-white films
Films shot in Sydney
1927 comedy films
Films based on Australian comics
Australian comedy films
1920s English-language films
Silent comedy films